Carlos Ometochtzin (Nahuatl for "Two Rabbit") or Ahuachpitzactzin, or Chichimecatecatl (Nahuatl for "Chichimec lord," is also known simply as Don Carlos of Texcoco,  was a member of the Acolhua nobility. His date of birth is unknown. In dispute is how old he was when he was executed by an episcopal Inquisition. He is known to history for his resistance to Christian evangelization.   He was burnt at the stake on November 30, 1539 at the order of Bishop Don Juan de Zumárraga, the first Catholic bishop of New Spain, for continuing to practice the pre-Hispanic religion. The main source of information on Don Carlos is the record of his inquisition trial, published in 1910 by the Mexican archives.

Don Carlos was a grandson of the famous Texcocan ruler Nezahualcoyotl through his son Nezahualpilli. He held significant lands in the Texcoco region in the Aztec codex known as the Oztoticpac Lands Map of Texcoco, from ca. 1540 just after his execution.

Map of Texcoco
The pictorial on native paper (amatl) from Texcoco ca. 1540 is held by the manuscript division of the Library of Congress, measuring 76 x 84 cm. The contents are both pictorial and alphabetic text in Nahuatl in red and black ink. The glosses indicate it deals with lands that Texcocan lord Ixtlilxochitl I may have given to Don Carlos with litigation over the lands' ownership.

The Oztoticpic Lands map was likely created between 1540 and 1544, as part of an effort to reclaim land held by Don Carlos. The map indicates a palace held by Don Carlos in Oztoticpac.  In the schematic cadastrals of particular pieces of land, the map shows Nahua families who farmed the land as well as the measurements of the plots. A number of these properties were rented by tenants with standard glyphic representations of the rents. The names of the pieces of land are indicated with toponymic glyphs.  The Oztoticpac Lands Map has been linked to another indigenous pictorial, the Humboldt Fragment VI held by the Berlin State Library. One of the most interesting and important features of the map is depictions of fruit trees, both European and local, many of them grafted. Pears, quince, apple, pomegranates, peaches, and grapevines are shown Income from the sale of fruit would have increased the value of the property. The importation of European fruit trees is part of the Columbian Exchange, but what is especially significant is that not just the trees were integrated into local horticulture, but the practice of grafting to increase the health and yield of the plants.

Further reading

Cline, Howard F. "The Oztoticpac Lands Map of Texcoco, 1540," in The Quarterly Journal of the Library of Congress, April 1966, pp. 77–115. Republished in A la Carte: Selected Papers on Maps and Atlases, Washington, DC: Library of Congress 1972, pp. 5–33.
Castaño, Victoria Ríos. "Not a Man of Contradiction: Zumárraga as Protector and Inquisitor of the Indigenous People of Central Mexico." Hispanic Research Journal 13, no. 1 (2012): 26-40.
Don, Patricia Lopes. Bonfires of Culture: Franciscans, Indigenous Leaders, and the Inquisition in Early Mexico, 1524-1540. Norman: University of Oklahoma Press 2010.
Don, Patricia Lopes. "The 1539 inquisition and trial of Don Carlos of Texcoco in early Mexico." Hispanic American Historical Review 88, no. 4 (2008): 573-606.
Don, Patricia Lopes. "Carnivals, triumphs, and rain gods in the new world: A civic festival in the city of México‐Tenochtitlán in 1539." Colonial Latin American Review 6, no. 1 (1997): 17-40.
Garagarza, Leon Garcia. "The 1539 Trial of Don Carlos Ometochtli and the Scramble for Mount Tlaloc." Mesoamerican Memory: Enduring Systems of Remembrance (2012).

García Garagarza, León. "The 1539 Trial of Don Carlos Ometochtli and the Scramble for Mount Tlaloc." In Mesoamerican Memory: Enduring Systems of Remembrance, eds. Amos Megged and Stephanie Wood, 193-214. Norman: University of Oklahoma Press 2012.*

Greenleaf, Richard E. "Persistence of native values: the inquisition and the Indians of colonial Mexico." The Americas 50, no. 3 (1994): 351-376.
Greenleaf, Richard E. "The Mexican Inquisition and the Indians: sources for the ethnohistorian." The Americas 34, no. 3 (1978): 315-344.
Lee, Jongsoo, and Galen Brokaw. Texcoco: prehispanic and colonial perspectives. University Press of Colorado, 2014.
Medrano, Ethelia Ruiz, translated by Russ Davidson. "Don Carlos de Tezcoco and the Universal Rights of Emperor Carlos V." Texcoco: Prehispanic and Colonial Perspectives. University Press of Colorado (2014).
Smith, Kevin Paul. "Here I stand!: Don Carlos of Texcoco, the Inquisition, and the end of Aztec resistance, 1539," Master's thesis, University of California Santa Barbara 2003.

References

Year of birth missing
1539 deaths
Aztec nobility
Indigenous Mexicans
Nahua people
History of Christianity in Mexico
People executed for heresy
Executed Mexican people
1539 in New Spain
People executed by New Spain
People executed by Spain by burning
Nobility of the Americas